Tilt-A-Whirl is a flat ride similar to the Waltzer in Europe, designed for commercial use at amusement parks, fairs, and carnivals, in which it is commonly found. The rides are manufactured by Larson International of Plainview, Texas.

Description 
The ride consists of seven freely-spinning cars that hold three or four riders each, which are attached at fixed pivot points on a rotating platform. As the platform rotates, parts of the platform are raised and lowered, with the resulting centrifugal and gravitational forces on the revolving cars causing them to spin in different directions and at variable speeds. The weight of passengers in these cars (as well as the weight distribution) may intensify or dampen the spinning motion of the cars, adding to the unpredictable nature known as chaotic motion.

Physicists Bret M. Huggard and Richard L. Kautz came up with a mathematical equation that approximates the motion of the Tilt-A-Whirl.

History 
Herbert Sellner invented the Tilt-A-Whirl in 1926 at his Faribault, Minnesota, home. In 1927, the first 14 Tilt-A-Whirls were built in Sellner's basement and yard. Sellner Manufacturing opened its factory in Faribault and the ride debuted at the Minnesota State Fair. More than a thousand rides were eventually built. Some of the rides produced in the 1940s and 1950s are still in operation.

The earliest Tilt-A-Whirls were constructed of wood, powered by gas motors, and featured nine cars. Modern rides are constructed of steel, aluminum and fiberglass, and are powered by seven small electric motors, and has seven cars.

In 1995, Tovah Sellner took over Sellner Manufacturing after the loss of her husband Bruce Sellner; her daughter Erin Sellner joined her in 1998 and the two of them ran the business together.

Modern Tilt-A-Whirls 
Modern Tilt-A-Whirls cost in excess of US$300,000 to purchase.  A Tilt-A-Whirl package comes with a choice to employ either the famous domed tipkarts (which were introduced back during the 1930s), or Waltzer-style open squat podkarts having headrest bars (that option was introduced by Sellner Manufacturing in 2003).

The oldest operating Tilt-A-Whirl is a 1927 model, traveling with Tom Evans United Shows in the US Midwest. Between six- and seven hundred Tilt-A-Whirls are in operation.

Conneaut Lake Park in Conneaut Lake, Pennsylvania, still has its original Tilt-A-Whirl from 1949.

Installations

Incidents and accidents 
On September 22, 2018, A Tilt-A-Whirl operated by Thomas Amusements in St. John's, Newfoundland malfunctioned when two of the cars crashed into each other causing the top of one of the cars to fall off and on to the platform. No serious injuries resulted but some of the passengers suffered minor injuries.

References

Further reading 
"It's been a tilting, whirling ride for 75 years," Minneapolis Star Tribune, 1-SEP-2001
Tilt-A-Whirl Chaos (I) Ivars Peterson's MathTrek
Tilt-A-Whirl Chaos (II) Ivars Peterson's MathTrek
Amusement Ride Extravaganza – Tilt-A-Whirl

External links 

Larson International Inc.
Sellner Manufacturing Co.
Random Terrain's Tilt-A-Whirl Tribute
Amusement Ride Extravaganza – Tilt-A-Whirl

Amusement rides
Amusement rides by type
Amusement rides introduced in 1926